Roger Telemachus (born 27 March 1973) is a former South African international cricketer. He has played 37 One Day Internationals and three Twenty20 Internationals for his country.

International career
In the famous 438-game played at the Wanderers on 12 March 2006, he got the wickets of two top Australian batsmen: Adam Gilchrist and Ricky Ponting, both caught in the field from his bowling.
 
Telemachus was also involved in what is probably the most bizarre stoppage in the history of cricket, when 'calamari stopped play'. During a regional match in South Africa, Telemachus was bowling to Daryll Cullinan, who hit the ball for six, whereupon it ended up in the kitchen and straight into a pan of frying calamari. According to Wisden, "Daryll Cullinan hit a six into a frying pan. It was about ten minutes before the ball was cool enough for the umpires to remove the grease. Even then, the bowler was unable to grip the ball and it had to be replaced".

References

External links
 

1973 births
Living people
People from Stellenbosch
South African cricketers
South Africa One Day International cricketers
South Africa Twenty20 International cricketers
Boland cricketers
Knights cricketers
Free State cricketers
Western Province cricketers
South African cricket coaches
Cricketers from the Western Cape